Doodnauth Singh (16 June 1933 – 21 August 2013) was Attorney General of Guyana from 2001 to 2009, and also served as a People's Progressive Party (PPP) Member of the National Assembly.

He was educated at Skeldon High School, Central High School in Georgetown, and London's Regent Street Polytechnic (Diploma in Economics), and was called to the bar at Middle Temple in December 1958. He was a former Chairman of the Guyana Elections Commission (GECOM). He had six children, including Gina Miller.

Singh's practice extends to the Caribbean, representing individuals in many countries, including in 1990 as defense counsel for Anisa Abu Bakr, wife of Yasin Abu Bakr, in the failed coup in Trinidad and Tobago. He is also part of the legal team appearing in the murder trial of former Grenadian Prime Minister Maurice Bishop. In addition, he served as a prosecutor under Eugenia Charles in Dominica.

In 1997, he was Chairman of the Electoral Commission for the presidential and regional elections.

He was Attorney General of Guyana between 2001 and 2009.

References

1933 births
2013 deaths
Members of the Middle Temple
Government ministers of Guyana
Members of the National Assembly (Guyana)
People's Progressive Party (Guyana) politicians
Attorneys General of Guyana
Guyanese people of Indian descent